Manchuru is a Gram Panchayat village that falls in the Chitoor District of Andhra Pradesh state, located in India. In the 2011 Census it had a population of 2,245.

Traditions
The temples of Ananthapuramma with Her image
in human form, Anjaneya, Someswara Swamy and
Sri Rama are the places of worship in the village.
Ananthapuramma Dhinnemeeda Tirunala is celebrated for two days on Phalguna Suddha Sapthami
and Ashtami (February - March). Animals are
sacrificed to the deity. Devotees liquidate their vows.
For the past 10 years it is being celebrated and is
limited to this village. Kamma community patronize
the festival. All local communities participate.

References

Villages in Chittoor district